Wildwood, New Jersey was incorporated on May 1, 1895 as a borough. and was reincorporated on January 1, 1912 as a city and merged with Holly Beach, New Jersey. It is governed by a three-member commission under the Walsh Act Commission form of municipal government. All three commissioners are elected at-large on a nonpartisan basis to serve concurrent four-year terms of office, with the vote taking place as part of the November general election. At a reorganization conducted after each election, the commission selects one of its members to serve as mayor and gives each commissioner an assigned department to oversee and operate. The mayors were:

Mayors

Mayors of Holly Beach City, New Jersey
Holly Beach, New Jersey was incorporated as a borough by an Act of the New Jersey Legislature on April 14, 1885, from portions of Lower Township, based on the results of a referendum held on March 31, 1885. The borough was reincorporated on April 1, 1890, based on a referendum held the previous day. The borough was reincorporated as Holly Beach City on May 4, 1897. On January 1, 1912, the area was included as part of the newly created Wildwood, New Jersey, and the borough was dissolved. The mayors were:

References

 
Wildwood